The 2014 Super Rugby season is the fourth season of the 15-team format for the Super Rugby competition involving teams from Australia, New Zealand and South Africa. For sponsorship reasons, this competition is known as Asteron Life Super Rugby in Australia, Investec Super Rugby in New Zealand and Vodacom Super Rugby in South Africa. Including its past incarnations as Super 12 and Super 14, this is the 19th season for the Southern Hemisphere's premier transnational club competition. The conference games will take place every weekend from 15 February until 12 July (with a three-week break between rounds 16 and 17 for internationals games), followed by the finals series, culminating in the grand final on 2 August. The winners of the 2014 Super Rugby Season were the New South Wales Waratahs

Competition format
Covering 24 weeks, the schedule features a total of 125 matches. The 15 teams are grouped by geography, labelled the Australian Conference, New Zealand Conference and the South African Conference. The regular season consists of two types of matches:
 Internal Conference Matches – Each team plays the other four teams in the same conference twice, home and away.
 Cross Conference Matches – Each team plays four teams of the other two conferences away, and four teams of the other two conferences home, thus missing out on two teams (one from each of the other conferences). Each team plays two home and two away games against teams from each of the other countries, making a total of eight cross conference games for each team. There will be a three-week international break between rounds 15 and 16 of the regular season.
The top team of each conference, plus the next top three teams in table points regardless of conference (wild card teams), will move on to the finals. The top two conference winners, based on table points, receive first-round byes. In the first round of the finals, the third conference winner is the #3 seed and hosts the wild card team with the worst record, and the best wild card team hosts the second-best wild card team. In the semi-finals, the #2 conference winner hosts the higher surviving seed from the first round, and the #1 conference winner hosts the other first-round winner. The final is hosted by the top remaining seed.
The two-legged promotion/relegation play-off initially scheduled between the bottom team in the South African Conference and the Southern Kings was abolished following a meeting on 13 February 2014.

Standings
Conference leaders and wildcard teams qualified to the finals. The top six teams qualified to the finals, with their final positions in the overall log determining their seedings in the finals. The third-placed team (i.e. the conference winners with the worst overall record) will host the sixth-placed team in the qualifiers, while the fourth-placed team will host the fifth-placed team. The top two teams (i.e. the two conference winners with the best overall record) will qualify directly to the semi-finals, where they will have home advantage against the two qualifier winners, with the top team hosting the qualifier winner with the lower seeding and the second-placed team hosting the qualifier winner with the higher seeding. The two semi-final winners will progress to the final, with the team with the higher seeding having home advantage.

Points breakdown: 4 points for a win, 2 points for a draw, 1 bonus point for a loss by seven points or less, 1 bonus point for scoring four or more tries in a match.

Classification: Teams standings are calculated as follows: Conference Leaders (i.e. conference leaders will always be ranked in the top three), Log points, Number of games won, Overall points difference, Number of tries scored, Overall try difference

Key: P = Games Played, W = Games Won, D = Games Drawn, L = Games Lost, PF = Points For, PA = Points Against, PD = Points Difference, TF = Tries For, TA = Tries Against, TB = Try Bonus Points, LB = Losing Bonus Points, Pts = Log Points

 Qualfied to the Semi-finals with  advantage
 Qualfied to the Qualifying final with  advantage 
 Qualfied to the Qualifying final

Round-by-round

Fixtures
The following fixtures were released 7 October 2013.

Round 1

Round 2

Round 3

Round 4

Round 5

Round 6

Round 7

Round 8

Round 9

Round 10

Round 11

Round 12

Round 13

Round 14

Round 15

Round 16

Round 17

Round 18

Round 19

Finals

Qualifiers

Semi-finals

Final

Players

Player statistics
The following table contain points which have been scored in competitive games in the 2014 Super Rugby season.

Squad lists

The teams released the following squad lists:

Blues

Brumbies

Cheetahs

Chiefs

Crusaders

Western Force

Highlanders

Hurricanes

Lions

Rebels

Reds

Sharks

Stormers

Waratahs

Referees
The following refereeing panel was appointed by SANZAR for the 2014 Super Rugby season:

Prior to Round 7, Jason Jaftha, James Leckie, Francisco Pastrana and Lourens van der Merwe were removed from the refereeing panel, Jaftha due to an anterior cruciate ligament injury that would see him miss four months of the season and the latter three in a move by SANZAR to recognise "who has performed to expectation and who has not."

Attendances

References

External links
 Super Rugby websites:
SANZAR Super Rugby
Australia Super Rugby
New Zealand Super Rugby

 SuperXV.com

 
2014
 
 
 
2014 rugby union tournaments for clubs